Las Vegas Fire & Rescue  provides fire protection and emergency medical services to the city of Las Vegas, Nevada. It is the second largest fire department in the state of Nevada after the Clark County Fire Department. The Las Vegas Fire & Rescue Department is responsible for preserving life and property for a population over 600,000 in an area totaling . Since 2009, the LVFRD has been one of only 9 fire departments in the United States that is accredited by both the Insurance Services Office (ISO) and the Commission on Fire Accreditation International (CFAI).

History
The department began in 1906 as the Las Vegas Volunteer Fire Department. As the city expanded, so did the demands for a full-time department. In August 1942, the department added its first full-time employees, a chief and 12 firefighters. In 1999, a city ordinance changed the name of the department from Las Vegas Fire Department to Las Vegas Fire & Rescue Department.

USAR Task Force 

The LVFRD is a member of Nevada Task Force 1 (NVTF-1), one of 28 Federal Emergency Management Agency (FEMA) Urban Search and Rescue Task Forces (USAR-TF) that are prepared to respond to state or federal disasters throughout the United States. The task force team is deployed by FEMA for the rescue of victims of structural collapses due to man-made or natural disasters.

MGM Grand Fire 

On November 21, 1980 the MGM Grand Hotel and Casino (now Bally's Las Vegas) in Paradise, Nevada suffered a major fire. The fire killed 85 people, most through smoke inhalation. The LVFRD was one of the agencies to respond to the fire which remains the worst disaster in Nevada history, and the third-worst hotel fire in modern U.S. history.

Stations & Apparatus

The LVFRD is currently made up of over 660 firefighters and paramedics and operates out of 21 Fire Stations, located throughout the city under the command of 3 Battalion Chiefs in 3 Battalions each shift.

References 

Fire departments in Nevada
Ambulance services in the United States
Government of Las Vegas
Government of Clark County, Nevada
Medical and health organizations based in Nevada